Suzhou HSR New Town (literally Suzhou High-Speed Rail New City), surrounding Suzhou North Railway Station on Beijing–Shanghai High-Speed Railway, is a new city located in the northern part of Suzhou, China. This new city is administrated by Xiangcheng District. It is a "city" in the "one core, four cities" plan of Suzhou. The promoter of it occupies an area of 4.7 km2, and its total area is 28.52 km2.

See also
Suzhou Lakeside New City

References

Geography of Suzhou
Xiangcheng District, Suzhou